Always Let Me Go is a live album by American pianist Keith Jarrett's "Standards Trio" featuring Gary Peacock and Jack DeJohnette recorded in concert in April 2001 at the Bunkamura Orchard Hall and Tokyo Bunka Kaikan, in Japan and released on the ECM label in 2002.

It is the fourth album to feature mainly original improvised material by the trio following Changes (1983), Changeless (1987), and Inside Out (2000).

Reception 

The AllMusic review by Glenn Swan awarded the album 4½ stars and states, "After 20 years of working together, they trust each other (and the audience) enough to deliver over two hours of unscripted music... it adds a rewarding layer of understanding and appreciation, as few musicians can deliver such diamonds with so little structure in place. Song for song, the symbiosis is a marvel to behold — and the audience knows it. These are gods at play, and the lightning bolts they toss around are awe-inspiring".

In a review for DownBeat, Thomas Conrad wrote: "Always Let Me Go sustains a heightened sense of imaginative focus through its sudden shifts, peaks and valleys, the exquisitely realized songs within songs that the trio comes upon... and the dramatic swings of its dynamic scope. In its 20th year, this trio keeps growing in its ability to challenge the creativity of its listeners."

The authors of The Penguin Guide to Jazz commented: "As a document of Jarrett's almost 150th performance in Japan, it's impeccable."

Track listing 
All compositions by Keith Jarrett except as indicated

Disc One
 "Hearts in Space" - 32:12
 "The River" - 3:34
 "Tributaries" (DeJohnette, Jarrett, Peacock) - 16:18
 "Paradox" - 9:01

Disc Two
 "Waves" - 34:25
 "Facing East" (DeJohnette, Jarrett, Peacock) - 14:04
 "Tsunami" - 14:51
 "Relay" - 13:00

Personnel 
 Keith Jarrett – piano
 Gary Peacock – double bass
 Jack DeJohnette – drums

Production
 Keith Jarrett – producer
 Manfred Eicher – producer
 Yoshihiro Suzuki – engineer (recording)
 Dieter Rehm – Ccver photo and design
 Fumiaki Fujimoto – liner photos

References 

Gary Peacock live albums
Jack DeJohnette live albums
Standards Trio albums
Keith Jarrett live albums
2002 live albums
ECM Records live albums
Albums produced by Manfred Eicher